Anatoly Ivanovich Rusanov (born 20 April 1932, in Leningrad) is a Russian chemist.
He is a member of the Russian Academy of Science since 1990.

He is graduated from Leningrad State University and currently is the head of the Colloid Chemistry Department of St. Petersburg State University.

Awards
 The State Prize of the USSR - 1981
 The Volfkovich prize of the Russian Chemical Society - 1991
 The Mendeleyev Prize of the Russian Academy of Sciences - 1993
 The Rehbinder Prize of the Russian Academy of Sciences - 2001

References
 Boris A Noskov, Anatoly Ivanovich Rusanov, Advances in Colloid and Interface Science, Vol. 110 (2004), pp. 1–3 

1932 births
Academic staff of Saint Petersburg State University
Saint Petersburg State University alumni
Living people
Full Members of the Russian Academy of Sciences